Corporal John William Harper VC (6 August 1916 – 29 September 1944) was a British Army soldier and an English recipient of the Victoria Cross (VC), the highest and most prestigious award for gallantry in the face of the enemy that can be awarded to British and Commonwealth forces.

Birth
John William Harper was born in Hatfield, Doncaster, West Riding of Yorkshire on 6 August 1916 to George Ernest Harper and his wife, Florence Parkin.

Details
Harper was 28 years old, and a corporal in the 4th Battalion, York and Lancaster Regiment, British Army during the Second World War when the following deed took place for which he was awarded the VC.

On 29 September 1944 during an assault on the Depot de Mendicite, Merksplas, Belgium, Corporal Harper led his section across 300 yards of completely exposed ground, with utter disregard for the hail of mortar bombs and small arms fire from the enemy. He was killed in the action, but the subsequent capture of the position was largely due to his self-sacrifice.

The medal
His Victoria Cross is held at The York & Lancaster Regiment Museum in Rotherham, South Yorkshire, England.

Memorials
His remains now lie at the War Cemetery at Leopoldsburg, near Limburg, Belgium, Plot No.5, Row B, Grave No.15.
A stained glass window, created by Frans Pelgrims and donated by the town of Merksplas (Belgium) as sign of an everlasting gratitude and respect, depicting Corporal Harper and the area of his final battle are shown in Hatfield St Lawrence Church.

His name is inscribed on the Hatfield Cemetery War Memorial.

References

British VCs of World War 2 (John Laffin, 1997)
Monuments to Courage (David Harvey, 1999)
The Register of the Victoria Cross (This England, 1997)

External links

CWGC entry

1916 births
1944 deaths
Burials in Belgium
People from Doncaster
York and Lancaster Regiment soldiers
British Army personnel killed in World War II
British World War II recipients of the Victoria Cross
British Army recipients of the Victoria Cross
Military personnel from Yorkshire